The Lonely Villa is a 1909 American short silent crime drama film directed by D. W. Griffith. The film stars David Miles, Marion Leonard and Mary Pickford in one of her first film roles. It is based on the 1901 French play Au Téléphone (At the Telephone) by André de Lorde. A print of The Lonely Villa survives and is currently in the public domain. The Lonely Villa was produced by the Biograph Company and shot in Fort Lee, New Jersey. It was released on June 10, 1909, along with another D.W. Griffith split-reel film, A New Trick.

Plot
A group of criminals wait until a wealthy man leaves to break into his house and threaten his wife and daughters. The wife and daughters take refuge inside one of the rooms, but the thieves break in. The father finds out what is happening and runs back home to try to save his family.

Cast

 David Miles as Robert Cullison
 Marion Leonard as Mrs. Robert Cullison
 Mary Pickford as the eldest Cullison daughter
 Gladys Egan as the youngest Cullison daughter
 Adele DeGarde as the second eldest  Cullison daughter
 Charles Avery guest at the Inn
 Clara T. Bracy
 John R. Cumpson as At the Inn
 Robert Harron
 Anita Hendrie as The Maid
 Arthur V. Johnson as At the Inn
 James Kirkwood as Among Rescuers
 Florence Lawrence
 Violet Mersereau as At the Inn
 Owen Moore - A Burglar
 Anthony O'Sullivan as A Burglar
 Frank Powell
 Herbert Prior as A Burglar
 Mack Sennett as The Butler/A Policeman

Production
The Lonely Villa is notable for one of the earliest applications of “cross-cutting in a peril-and-rescue sequence”, a cinematic method used to create suspense.

The film, 12-minutes in duration, includes a series of alternating shots depicting the mother desperately defending her children from intruders, with shots of the frantic father driving at high speed to reach his imperiled family. Griffith, by incrementally shortening the length of each cross-cut “heightened the excitement” of the event.

See also
 D. W. Griffith filmography
 Mary Pickford filmography
 List of American films of 1909
 List of films featuring home invasions

References

External links

 

1909 films
1900s crime drama films
1909 short films
American crime drama films
American silent short films
American black-and-white films
American films based on plays
Films directed by D. W. Griffith
Films shot in Fort Lee, New Jersey
Home invasions in film
Articles containing video clips
1900s American films
Silent American drama films